The Benjamin Marshall House is a historic house at 1541 Peterborough Road (New Hampshire Route 101) in Dublin, New Hampshire.  Built sometime between 1821 and 1833, it is a well-preserved example of a vernacular Greek Revival farmhouse. It was listed on the National Register of Historic Places in 1983.

Description and history
The Benjamin Marshall House is located in eastern Dublin, standing prominently at the northwest corner of New Hampshire Route 101 and Brush Brook Road. It is a rambling wood-frame structure, with a large -story main block, and a series of ells that extend west along the road, and to the building's rear. The main block presents a gable end to the street, with a five-bay ground floor, three-bay second floor, and a single window in the attic level. The main entrance is framed by sidelight windows, with secondary entrances in the two ells to the west.

The oldest portion of the house, now probably a portion of its main block, was built in 1821 as a Cape-style -story structure by Benjamin Marshall, a local carpenter and blacksmith who had his workshop on the property. Marshall greatly enlarged it in 1833. A number of its owners have been prominent in local affairs, serving as town selectman and road agent. In the late 20th century the house was owned by schoolteacher and folk musician Bob McQuillen, who called it "The Quacker Box".

See also
National Register of Historic Places listings in Cheshire County, New Hampshire

References

Houses on the National Register of Historic Places in New Hampshire
Greek Revival houses in New Hampshire
Houses completed in 1821
Houses in Dublin, New Hampshire
National Register of Historic Places in Dublin, New Hampshire